Stella Club d'Adjamé is an Ivorian football club based in Abidjan.

History
It was founded in 1953 in a fusion between Red Star, Etoile d'Adjamé and US Bella. They play at the Stade Robert Champroux.

Current squad

Former players

 Kouame Desré Kouakou
 N'guessan Serges
 Maguy Serges
 Jean-Marc Benie
 Kanga Gauthier Akalé
 Franck Kessié
 Gadji-Celi
 Moumouni Dagano
 Kandia Traoré
 Jean-Jacques Gosso
 Lézou Dogba
 N'zi Laurent Thoscani
 Evariste Kouadio
 Ibrahima Fanny
 Jean Louis Bozon
 Penan Bruno
 Abou Diomandé
 Kouamé Binger
 Koffi Konan Bébé
 N'Zi Appolinaire
 Kassi Jean Baptiste
 Seydou Ouattara
 Djiké Honoré
 Tony Kouassi
 Koffi N'Guessan Akpi
 Aoulou Blaise
 Bohé Norbert
 Beugré Inago
 Moshé Inago
 Lorougnon Clément
 Onébo Maxime
 Youzan
 Beugré Boli
 Akoupo N'Cho Jonas
 Abdoulaye Traoré Ben Badi
 Konaté Losseni
 Dié Foneyé
 Gbizié Léon
 Biady Nestor
 Goro Sara Jules
 Affly Dassé

Achievements
Côte d'Ivoire Premier Division: 3
1979, 1981, 1984.

Côte d'Ivoire Cup: 3
1974, 1975, 2012.

Coupe de la Ligue de Côte d'Ivoire: 1
 2015.

Coupe Houphouët-Boigny: 2
1977, 1984.

African Cup Winners' Cup: 0
Runners-up - 1975.

CAF Cup: 1
1993.

West African Club Championship (UFOA Cup): 1
1981.

Performance in CAF competitions
 African Cup of Champions Clubs: 3 appearances
1980: Second Round
1982: Second Round
1985: First Round

CAF Cup: 1 appearance
1993 - Champion

CAF Cup Winners' Cup: 3 appearances
1975 - Finalist
1976 - Quarter-Finals
1977 - Quarter-Finals

References 

 
Football clubs in Ivory Coast
Football clubs in Abidjan
Association football clubs established in 1953
1953 establishments in Ivory Coast
Sports clubs in Ivory Coast
CAF Cup winning clubs